Logrești is a commune in Gorj County, Oltenia, Romania. It is composed of seven villages: Colțești, Frunza, Logrești-Moșteni, Măru, Popești, Seaca and Târgu Logrești (the commune centre).

References

Communes in Gorj County
Localities in Oltenia